Pizza Delight is a Canadian pizza restaurant franchise. It was founded in 1968 in Shediac, New Brunswick by Léandre Bourque and Allard Robichaud and then later purchased by Bernard Imbeault and two of his friends. The chain's head offices are now located in Moncton. The restaurant primarily serves pizza, pasta and salad dishes. Today, it has over 95 restaurants, and operates in Ontario and Atlantic Canada.

Imvescor
In 2000, Pizza Delight purchased Mikes, a prominent chain in Quebec and Ontario, for $15 million.  Further acquisitions followed; the company acquired Scores in 2005, and Baton Rouge in 2006.  In 2006, it changed its name to Imvescor, to reflect its larger stable of restaurants.  At its peak, the company owned and operated over 350 restaurants across Canada under four different banners. These included:

 95 Pizza Delights
 94 Mikes Restaurants
 28 Bâton Rouge Restaurants
 40 Scores Restaurants

In December 2017, MTY Food Group acquired Imvescor (including Pizza Delight) for $248 million.

See also
List of Canadian restaurant chains

References

External links

Pizza chains of Canada
1968 establishments in New Brunswick
Restaurants established in 1968
Companies based in Moncton
Food and drink in New Brunswick
Restaurants in New Brunswick
Restaurant chains in Canada